The University of Verona is a university located in Verona, Italy. It was founded in 1982 and is organized in 12 Departments. According to business newspaper Il Sole 24 Ore, it is ranked as the best non-private university in Italy in 2014, 2015 and 2016.

History

In Verona, at the beginning of the 1950s, a group of Catholic intellectuals established the "Ludovico Antonio Muratori" Free High School of Historical Science, together with the magazine Nova Historia.

It was from this group of scholars that the idea of building a university in Verona was created. The idea took shape in February 1959 when the then-mayor, Prof. Giorgio Zanotto, placed as the order of the day during a session of the Municipal Council "the institution in Verona of a University Faculty of Economics and Commerce".

The Provincial Administration and Chamber of Commerce were in ready agreement. Thus they created the Free Faculty of Economics and Commerce and the Consortium for university studies to manage it. In the summer of 1959 the project began, the location in Palazzo Giuliari was decided, donated by Countess Giuliari Tusini and which is now home to the Chancellor's office. Enrolments began and on 1 November of the same year, the inauguration ceremony of the new Faculty was held.

But the lack of government recognition hindered everyone's expectations, both of the Veronese public bodies and the students themselves. The city authorities immediately joined together to find a solution and in 1963 Padua University recognised the Faculty of Economics and Commerce as part of its own Faculty with a branch in Verona. In July 1963 the first thesis of the first graduate of the new Veronese faculty was examined.

Shortly after Padua decided to transfer the Medical and Surgical and Legal sections to Verona, which has now become Arts and Philosophy.

The project that gave rise to the history of Verona University was finally and definitively achieved in 1982, when the governmental authorities gave Verona the autonomy and status of its university. 

Thanks to the precious support and strict collaboration of the main public and private governmental institutional representatives, both regional and local, and thanks to the support of its expert teachers, Verona University has grown over the years to have the fifteen departments it has today. Under the encouragement of recent reforms on didactics, Verona University now proposes numerous, innovative degree courses to offer students a wide and specific range of study choices, in time with change, but always careful to keep up the quality of teaching. From a location point of view, Verona University has two important poles: Veronetta, where the humanistic departments are to be found and Borgo Roma, the site of the Medicine and Science departments, besides the many other locations spread throughout the territory: Legnago (VR), Vicenza, Bolzano, Trento and Rovereto.

Organization
These are the 12 departments into which the university is divided:

 Biotechnology
 Business Administration
 Computer Science
 Economics
 Foreign Languages and Literatures
 Law
 Medicine
 Neurological, Neuropsychological, Morphological and Movement Sciences
 Philosophy, Education and Psychology 
 Public Health and Community Medicine 
 Surgery 
 Time, Space, Image, Society

Rectors
Carlo Vanzetti (1982-1983)
Hrayr Terzian (1983-1986)
Sebastiano Cassarino (1986-1992)
Mario Marigo (1992-1997)
Elio Mosele (1999-2004)
Alessandro Mazzucco (2004-2013)
Nicola Sartor (2013-2019)
Pier Francesco Nocini (2019-)

Notes and references

See also 
 List of Italian universities
 Verona

External links
 University of Verona Official Site

 
Verona
Educational institutions established in 1982
1982 establishments in Italy